Map of places in Aberdeen compiled from this list
See the list of places in Scotland for places in other counties.

This List of places in Aberdeen is a list of links for any town, village, hamlet, castle, golf course, historic house, nature reserve, reservoir, river, and other place of interest in the Aberdeen City council area of Scotland.

 

A
Aberdeen Art Gallery
Aberdeen Arts Centre
Aberdeen Beach and Queens Links
Aberdeen Castle
Aberdeen Exhibition and Conference Centre
Aberdeen International Airport
Aberdeen Maritime Museum
Aberdeen railway station
Altens
Ashgrove
Auchmill Golf Club

B
Balnagask Golf Club
Beach Ballroom
Berryden
Bieldside
Braeside
Bridge of Dee
Bridge of Don
Brig o' Balgownie
Broomhill
Bucksburn

C
Cornhill
Cove Bay
Craibstone Golf Centre
Craigiebuckler
Cults
Cummings Park
Cruickshank Botanic Gardens

D
Danestone
Deeside Golf Club
Deeside Way
Doonies Farm
Duthie Park and Winter Gardens
Dyce, Dyce railway station

F
Ferryhill
Footdee
Foresterhill
Formartine and Buchan Way
Froghall

G
Garthdee
Gordon Highlanders Museum
Gray's School of Art

H
Hanover
Hazlehead, Hazlehead Golf Club, Hazlehead Park
Heathryfold
Hilton
His Majesty's Theatre

J
Johnston Gardens

K
Kaimhill
Kincorth
King's Links Golf Club
Kingswells
Kirk of St Nicholas
Kittybrewster

L
Leggart

M
Mannofield
Marischal College
Mastrick
Middlefield
Midstocket
Milltimber
Murcar Links Golf Club
Music Hall

N
Nigg
Northfield

O
Old Aberdeen

P
Peterculter, Peterculter Golf Club
Pittodrie Stadium
Powis
Provost Ross's House
Provost Skene's House

Q
Queen's Cross

R
River Dee
River Don
Robert Gordon's College
Robert Gordon University
Rosehill
Rosemount
Royal Aberdeen Golf Club
Rubislaw, Rubislaw and Queens Terrace Gardens
Ruthrieston

S
Scotstown Moor
Seafield
Seaton, Seaton Park
Sheddocksley
St Andrew's Cathedral
St Machar's Cathedral
St Mary's Cathedral
Stewart Park
Stockethill
Stoneywood
Summerhill
Sunnybank

T
Tillydrone
Torry
Tullos

U
Union Terrace Gardens
University of Aberdeen

V
Victoria Park

W
Westburn Park
William Wallace Statue
Woodside

See also
List of places in Scotland
List of places in Aberdeenshire

Places
Aberdeen
Geography of Aberdeen
Lists of places in Scotland
Populated places in Scotland
Tourist attractions in Aberdeen